Reminiscin' is an album by saxophonist Gigi Gryce recorded in 1960 for the Mercury label.

Reception

The contemporaneous DownBeat reviewer, Ira Gitler, concluded: "Gryce has achieved a balance between the blowing and arranged sections. The latter set off the former, investing the soloists' spots with greater interest and making the album a success". AllMusic reviewer Ron Wynn awarded the album 3 stars stating: "This is alternately reflective, dashing, and sentimental."

Track listing
All compositions by Gigi Gryce except as indicated
 "Blue Lights" – 3:25    
 "Caravan" (Duke Ellington, Juan Tizol, Irving Mills) – 4:26  
 "Reminiscing" – 4:01  
 "Yesterdays" (Jerome Kern, Otto Harbach) – 4:46  
 "Gee Blues Gee" (Randy Weston) – 3:22   
 "A Night in Tunisia" (Dizzy Gillespie, Frank Paparelli) – 5:12  
 "Dearly Beloved" (Jerome Kern, Johnny Mercer) – 4:20  
 "Take the "A" Train" (Billy Strayhorn) – 3:36 
Recorded in New York City on November 7 (track 6), November 9 (tracks 1, 5 & 7) and November 10 (tracks 2–4 & 8), 1960

Personnel 
Gigi Gryce – alto saxophone 
Richard Williams – trumpet
Eddie Costa – vibraphone (tracks 2–4, 6 & 8) 
Richard Wyands – piano
George Duvivier (tracks 2–4 & 8), Julian Euell (tracks 1, 5 & 7), Reggie Workman (track 6) – bass
Walter Perkins (tracks 1, 5 & 7), Bobby Thomas (tracks 2–4, 6 & 8) – drums

References 

1960 albums
Gigi Gryce albums
Mercury Records albums